The National Popular Front (also known as the National People's Front; , Ethniko Laiko Metopo (ELAM)) is a far-right, ultranationalist movement (and later, political party), founded in 2008 in the Republic of Cyprus. It describes its ideology as "popular and social nationalism". As of May 2011, it has been approved as a legal political party. ELAM is a Eurosceptic political party which also praises Greek former prime minister Ioannis Metaxas. It was also accused of supporting Neo-Nazism, due to its past connections with the Golden Dawn.

Background
Prior to the official formation of the National Popular Front, the organisation existed under the name "Golden Dawn: Cypriot Kernel". The kernel was established in late 2000, and was led by the current ELAM president Christos Christou, who was an active member of the Golden Dawn political party in Greece. The kernel attempted to register as a political party with the same name, but the name was rejected by the state's authorities, resulting in the use of the name "National Popular Front" as an alternative.

Program
The party's 2011 manifesto proclaims that the party promotes a strict anti-federalist line concerning the Cyprus dispute, a zero-toleration anti-immigration policy concerning illegal immigration, a strict Greek-centered public education to counter the "slavery of globalization"; and an energy policy that would take full advantage of Cyprus' exclusive economic zone.

In 2019, The Party submitted a bill seeking to impose a ban on all Muslim headgear in public spaces, including schools.

Violence involving ELAM
The party has been the subject of controversy in the Cypriot media and the broader political scene. It has been repeatedly accused of promoting racism and being involved in acts of violence. In July 2010, it was reported that after the condemnation ceremonies against the Turkish invasion of 1974 on 20 July, people with ELAM T-shirts attacked a Nigerian man in Makariou street in Nicosia.
On 19 March 2011, eyewitnesses reported that members of ELAM beat up a lottery seller in Lidras street in Nicosia after a disagreement in political views.
Furthermore, it was reported that eight ELAM members, one of which ranked as a second lieutenant in the Cypriot National Guard, were arrested by the police in connection to an attack against university students during the student elections of the University of Nicosia on 6 December 2011.
In addition, local newspaper Haravgi reported that on 11 May 2012, a second lieutenant was found training ELAM members in shooting mortars in a National Guard's shooting ground. The Ministry of Defense confirmed that an officer had been charged for calling a non-authorized person for shooting in a shooting ground, but specified that it was a rifle shooting. The Ministry made no comment on possible political connections to the incident.

On 26 March 2014, ELAM members attempted to interrupt and stop a reunification conference in Limassol, in which one of the speakers was the Turkish Cypriot politician Mehmet Ali Talat. It was reported that members of ELAM broke through the police lines, broke a window and threw a flare in the conference hall, while a Turkish Cypriot journalist was slightly injured. ELAM was protesting against the presence of Mehmet Ali Talat in the conference, calling him a "war criminal".

ELAM has officially opposed its association with the incidents mentioned, stating that no ELAM members have been convicted for the specific crimes that its members have been accused of. It further accused the media and other organisations for intentionally connecting the movement with the incidents, in order to damage its public image.

Past connections with Golden Dawn

ELAM had been openly connected with Greek far-right political party Golden Dawn, which it described in the past as a "brother movement". Members and supporters of ELAM celebrated in the streets after the Greek legislative electoral results of May 2012, which gave Golden Dawn representation in the Greek parliament for the first time. The party officially congratulated the leader of Golden Dawn, Nikolaos Michaloliakos, for their electoral success.
ELAM's anti-occupation march against the ongoing Turkish occupation that was held on 20 July 2012 at Ledra Palace was also attended by Golden Dawn MP Polibios Zisimopoulos, who was invited by ELAM and gave a speech concerning the Greek economic crisis and the Turkish occupation of Cyprus.
In late December of 2012, ELAM announced its candidate Georgios Charalambous; for the upcoming presidential elections; in the presence of two notable members of Golden Dawn, Giannis Lagos and Ilias Kasidiaris. It was reported that in the presentation Ilias Kasidiaris stated that "ELAM and Golden Dawn are not simply brother parties" and that "ELAM is the Golden Dawn of Cyprus".

In October 2013 Greek Golden Dawn MPs Ilias Kasidiaris and Artemis Matheopoulos stated that ELAM is being financed by Golden Dawn. In June 2020, ELAM explained it had officially cut ties with Golden Dawn. Its leader cited that the party was following its own strategy, acting independently.

In 2020, ELAMs party leader Christos Christou confirmed that the party was no longer aligned with Golden Dawn and that the two had parted ways.

Electoral results

President of Cyprus

House of Representatives

European Parliament

References

Further reading
 

Far-right parties in Europe
Far-right political parties in Cyprus
Greek Cypriot nationalism
National conservative parties
Political parties established in 2008
Euroscepticism in Cyprus